David Bonneville (Porto, 1978) is a film director and screenwriter of French and English descent.

Education and background 

Bonneville received the University of Westminster academic Excellence scholarship for his MA in Screenwriting & Producing. He holds a Deutsche Film- und Fernsehakademie Berlin Directing Diploma in the context of the Gulbenkian Foundation Arts Programme. David has also completed a BA (Hons) Sound & Image (first class degree), having studied at the Catholic University of Portugal and the Pompeu Fabra University. David speaks six languages: Portuguese, Spanish, and English fluently, also French, elementary Italian and Catalan.

David has been a mentor and lecturer at the Masaryk University, The Actors Centre, University of Westminster, ETIC Academy - Escola de Tecnologias Inovação e Criação, and several other national and international structures.

Bonneville began his career by assisting Turner-Prize winner Douglas Gordon and Cannes Palme d'Or winner Manoel de Oliveira. He has also worked at the BBC.

Films 

The Last Bath   is primarily set in the Douro valley region of Portugal. The film won Best Picture, Best Original Screenplay and Best Art Direction Sophia Awards by the Academy of Motion Picture Arts & Sciences of Portugal. It also garnered the Golden Globe for Best Actress (Anabela Moreira) and the Screen Actors Guild GDA Newcomer Award (Martim Canavarro). The film premiered at the Tokyo, São Paulo, Santa Barbara and Gothenburg Film Festivals, winning several accolades in Paris, Oslo, Liverpool, Trieste, Skopje, Vancouver and at the Luso-Brazilian Film Festival. It was broadcast on RTP2 in December 2021, June 2022 and February 2023. 

Cigano aka 'Gypsy' (Golden Palm in Mexico; Golden Cat in Izmir; Elche Best Fiction Award in Spain; etc.) was funded by the Portuguese Film Board and premiered at the Locarno International Film Festival. It was a SXSW and Hamptons Film Festival nominee.

L'Arc-en-Ciel (Best Actress Award at the International Portuguese Language Film Festival) premiered at Fantasporto and was funded by the Gulbenkian Foundation and the RTP. 
 
Heiko (Best Short Film at the 24th Mix:Copenhagen Film Festival/Denmark and Special Mention at the 10th Slamdance Film Festival/Park City, Utah, USA) is commercially distributed in the UK by Peccadillo Pictures. Heiko has screened at more than 70 festivals worldwide, taking Bonneville to the 58th Berlin Film Festival.

Selected filmography 
 2020 - The Last Bath 
 2015 - Farewell
 2013 - Cigano
 2010 - Eden
 2009 - L'Arc-en-Ciel
 2008 - Heiko
 2007 - The Balcony 
 2007 - Photomotion 
 2005 - Maquette
 2004 - Le Déjeuner Répéter

References

External links 

 
  Profile at the Berlinale Talents
 
 APR

Living people
Portuguese film directors
People from Porto
1978 births
Pompeu Fabra University alumni
Catholic University of Portugal alumni
Alumni of the University of Westminster